The Okefenokee pygmy sunfish, Elassoma okefenokee, is a species of pygmy sunfish found in southeastern United States, where it prefers waters with dense vegetation growth in the Altamaha drainage in southern Georgia south to Lake Okeechobee, Florida, interior lake basins in north-central Florida, and upper Suwannee, Withlacoochee, and Hillsborough river drainages on the Gulf Coast of Florida. This species can reach  in total length.

Description
The Okefenokee pygmy sunfish is an olive green color fish with brownish-red mottling across the body, mixed with bright blue colors. Elassoma okefenokee differs from its close relative Elassoma gilberti by only having three preopercular canals (gilberti has, on average, four). The average number of anal fin rays is seven in E. gilberti whereas E. okefenokee has 8. The female E. gilberti often expresses a blue patch of color behind her eye and on her body, while the E. okefenokee does not.

Diet
Some good foods to try in the aquarium are California blackworms, daphnia, Grindal worms, microworms, and having a healthy population of snails. Some pygmy sunfish will learn to supplement their diet with crushed flake food, but this should not be relied upon as the only food source. The crushed fish flakes are a good idea, though, because they will feed the microfauna that will in turn feed the Elassoma.

Habitat
Elassoma okefenokee is a freshwater, demersal fish which spends its time in dense vegetation growth in waters with a pH range of 6.0-8.0 and a dH range of 5-unknown. Their preferred temperature range is 18 °C - 28 °C.

Reproduction and life cycle
The male turns black with blue sparkles while the females remains clear, tan, and light brown.

Importance to humans
E. okefenokee are moderate-expert aquarium fish. They can breed in as little as 5 gallons of water and prefer a well planted aquarium.

Etymology
Elassoma stems from the Greek, elasson (meaning smaller) plus the Greek, soma (meaning body) in reference to the fishes' diminutive size compared to the true sunfishes

See also
Elassomatidae
List of fish families

References

 Some of the content in this article was copied from Okefenokee Pygmy Sunfish (Elassoma okefenokee) at the Aquarium Wiki, which is licensed under the Creative Commons Attribution-Share Alike 3.0 (Unported) (CC-BY-SA) license.

Sources

Fish of the United States
Endemic fauna of the United States
Elassoma
Fish described in 1956